Operation Dal-Bhat was an operation carried out by Bangladesh Rifles to provide grocery items (Dal Bhaat) to low income groups in Bangladesh. The operation was carried out during the Caretaker Government of Fakhruddin Ahmed. It was one of the main reasons behind the Bangladesh Rifles Mutiny of 2009. Colonel Mujibul Haque who was killed in the mutiny was in charge of the operation. The Mutineers demanded their share of the profits from the operation.

References

Military history of Bangladesh
History of Bangladesh (1971–present)
2000s in Dhaka